Electridae is a family of bryozoans in the order Cheilostomatida.

Genera
The World Register of Marine Species lists the following genera:
Arbocuspis Nikulina, 2010
Arbopercula Nikulina, 2010
Aspidelectra Levinsen, 1909
Bathypora MacGillivray, 1885
Charixa Lang, 1915
Conopeum Gray, 1848
Conopeum seurati
Einhornia Nikulina, 2007
Electra Lamouroux, 1816
Electra pilosa
Electra posidoniae
Gontarella Grischenko, Taylor & Mawatari, 2002
Harpecia Gordon, 1982
Lapidosella Gontar, 2010
Mychoplectra Gordon & Parker, 1991
Osburnea Nikulina, 2010
Pyripora d'Orbigny, 1849
Tarsocryptus Tilbrook, 2011
Villicharixa Gordon, 1989

References

Cheilostomatida
Bryozoan families